Hydrogamasus is a genus of mites in the family Ologamasidae. There are at least four described species in Hydrogamasus.

Species
These four species belong to the genus Hydrogamasus:
 Hydrogamasus giardi (Berlese & Trouessart, 1889)
 Hydrogamasus kensleri Luxton, 1967
 Hydrogamasus littoralis (Canestrini &  Canestrini, 1881)
 Hydrogamasus vitzthumi Hirschmann, 1966

References

Ologamasidae